Richard Stone (November 27, 1953 – March 9, 2001) was an American composer. He played an important part in the revival of Warner Bros. animation in the 1990s, composing music and songs for Looney Tunes, Tiny Toon Adventures, Taz-Mania, The Plucky Duck Show, Animaniacs, Pinky and the Brain, Pinky, Elmyra & the Brain,  Histeria!, The Sylvester & Tweety Mysteries, Freakazoid!, and Road Rovers, as well as the Warner Bros. Family Entertainment fanfare. Many consider him to be an heir to the style of Carl W. Stalling.

After studying cello with Lloyd Smith and Orlando Cole in addition to music theory at the Curtis Institute of Music, Stone went on to earn a degree at Indiana University's Jacobs School of Music. In 1980, he moved to California to work as a music editor with such composers as Georges Delerue on Platoon and other films) and Maurice Jarre (on The Witness).

He went on to write music for various feature films and television series including the Bruce Campbell western Sundown: The Vampire in Retreat (1989), Tripwire (1989), Never on Tuesday (1989), Pumpkinhead (1988), North Shore (1987), Summer Heat (1987), and the 1991 miniseries In a Child's Name. Stone worked on John Hughes films including Ferris Bueller's Day Off and Sixteen Candles (both scored by Ira Newborn). Stone also composed the music for the William Shatner series, Rescue 911. Stone also scored the PBS Documentary "Medal of Honor" along with Mark Watters.

Stone has won several Emmy Awards for Outstanding Music Direction and Composition for Animaniacs and Histeria, as well as Outstanding Original Song, shared with lyricist, writer, creator and senior producer Tom Ruegger, for the main titles of Animaniacs and Freakazoid!. Stone shared many of his music direction/composing awards with his team of composers, who included Steven Bernstein, Carl Johnson, Julie Bernstein, Gordon Goodwin and Tim Kelly.

According to Animaniacs writer/producer Paul Rugg, crew members fondly referred to Richard as "The Great Stonini", a sort of musical magician whose compositions and orchestrations often raised the quality of the cartoons to unexpected musical and artistic heights.

Death
Stone died at his home in the West Hills area of Los Angeles on March 9, 2001, from pancreatic cancer at the age of 47. A memorial service was held in the Eastwood Scoring Stage at Warner Bros. Studios the following month.

References

External links

1953 births
2001 deaths
American film score composers
Daytime Emmy Award winners
American male film score composers
Musicians from Philadelphia
Musicians from Los Angeles
Deaths from cancer in California
Deaths from pancreatic cancer
Curtis Institute of Music alumni
Jacobs School of Music alumni
20th-century American composers
Animation composers
20th-century American male musicians